Clash! is an American comedy game show which aired on Ha! from May 1, 1990 to March 31, 1991, and on CTV: The Comedy Network/Comedy Central (Ha!'s successor) from April 1 to December 28. The show was produced and hosted by Billy Kimball, and the theme song was composed by Carter Burwell.

Episodes were broadcast weekdays at 10:30 AM and 6:30 PM.

Format
Clash! was presented in an absurdist quiz show format in which two teams of three players each competed for prizes. Contestants were selected based on criteria such as occupation, ethnicity, religion, etc. and each team would represent one half of a rivalry. For example, an episode might pit nudists against fashion designers, librarians against noisy people, or vegetarians against butchers. Some rivalries were altered for comedic effect, such as "Cowboys vs. Indians" in which the Indians were people from India.

The game was played in three rounds. In each of the first two rounds the teams were shown four categories with four questions. The questions were each worth ten points in the first round, and twenty in the second round, with no penalty for a wrong answer. The second round had one question replaced with a "Grudge Match" in which the one member of each team competed against each other in a bizarre stunt of some sort.

The third round  consisted of three questions increasing in value of 50, 100, and 150 points. In this round, points were deducted for wrong answers. The team with the highest score won a prize and advanced to the "Oval of Odds" bonus round.

The contestant who scored the most points for their team spun a six-spaced wheel and answered a single question. Giving the correct answer won a bonus prize. Five of the spaces each had a question that was extremely difficult ("What is the third word on the thirty-third page of the third book from the right on the third shelf of the third cabinet from the left in the Clash library?") while the last space had a question that was extremely easy ("What did you have for breakfast this morning?" or "How are you?").

References

External links
 

Comedy Central original programming
1990s American comedy game shows
1990 American television series debuts
1991 American television series endings
Comedy Central game shows